The Cancer Information Service (CIS) is a program of the National Institutes of Health (through the National Cancer Institute) that is provided to the United States of America public to provide personalized, confidential responses to specific questions about cancer.  The CIS also provides help to those who wish to quit smoking.

The best way to get a question answered is by calling the CIS directly through their free 800 number, 1-800-4CANCER (800 422-6237).  CIS Information Specialists are also available through instant messaging, provided at the CIS homepage.

See also

 American Cancer Society Cancer Action Network
 American Cancer Society Center
 National Comprehensive Cancer Network
 NCI-designated Cancer Center
 Oncology

References

External links
CIS Home

National Institutes of Health
Cancer organizations based in the United States
Cancer awareness